The Association of Christian Schools, Colleges and Universities (ACSCU) was established in 1946. It recognizes and commits itself to the sacred task of providing quality Christian education and promoting among its members a sense of unity, understanding and fellowship for better service to the community.

The members are non-stock and non-profit Protestant founded schools or institutions in the Philippines which are affiliated with Christian churches or denominations. Each includes the teaching of the Holy Bible as part of its curricula, particularly teaching that Jesus Christ is the only Incarnate Son of God. All revenues and grants received are utilized for educational services to the students. 

ACSCU is a founding member of the Coordinating Council of Private Educational Associations (COCOPEA). It cooperates with the COCOPEA member associations, namely: the Catholic Educational Association of the Philippines (CEAP), the Philippine Association of Colleges and Universities (PACU), the Philippine Association of Private Schools, Colleges and Universities (PAPSCU), and the Technical-Vocational Schools Association of the Philippines (TEVSAPHIL).

ACSCU is still a growing association. At present it consists only of one hundred eighteen (118) member schools spread in 16 regions of the Philippines: six universities, three seminaries, 40 colleges, and 69 basic education schools.

Representation
There are eleven (11) denominations represented in ACSCU, namely:
 Convention of Philippine Baptist Churches
 Episcopal Church in the Philippines
 First Church of God
 Independent Baptist Church
 Interdenominational Church
 Philippine Baptist Church
 Philippine Independent Church
 Seventh-day Adventist Church
 United Church of Christ in the Philippines
 United Evangelical Church
 United Methodist Church

External links

Christian educational organizations
Educational organizations based in the Philippines
Private and independent school organizations
1946 establishments in the Philippines